Cesare Casadei (born 10 January 2003) is an Italian professional footballer who plays as a midfielder for  club Reading, on loan from Chelsea, and the Italian under-21 national team.

Club career

Early life and Inter Milan
Born in Ravenna and growing up in Milano Marittima, Casadei started playing football at Cervia before joining Cesena. In 2018, after the latter club faced bankruptcy, the midfielder moved to Inter Milan, where he quickly came through the youth ranks, winning a national Under-17 championship in 2019 and rising to the Under-19 squad while still being only seventeen.

In October 2021, he was included in The Guardian's yearly "Next Generation" list, featuring the highest-rated prospects born in 2003. The following year, Casadei received his first call-ups to Inter Milan's first team, while contributing to the U19's final victory in the Campionato Primavera 1.

Chelsea
On 19 August 2022, it was announced that Chelsea had agreed a deal with Inter Milan for the signing of Cesare Casadei on a six-year contract. His transfer fee was reported to be in the range of 15 million euros, plus 5 million euros in add-ons.

Casadei was included in the U21 team, and on 31 August he made his debut against Sutton United, losing 1–0 in an EFL Trophy match and being red carded. Four days later, he made his Premier League 2 debut, when he scored a 48th-minute goal to make it 2–0 against Everton U21.

Loan to Reading
On 30 January 2023, Casadei was loaned to Championship side Reading until the end of the season. He went on to make his full professional debut on 4 February, starting in a 2–2 league draw against Watford. He scored his first goal for the club on 15 March 2023 in a 2-1 loss at Blackburn Rovers.

International career
Casadei has represented Italy at almost all youth international levels, from the Under-16 to the Under-21 national team.

In June 2022, he was included in the squad that took part in the UEFA Under-19 European Championship in Slovakia, where Italy reached the semi-finals before getting knocked out by eventual champions England.

On 19 November 2022, he made his debut for the Italy U21 squad in a friendly match lost 4–2 against Germany.

In December 2022, he was involved in a training camp led by the Italian senior national team's manager, Roberto Mancini, and aimed to the most promising national talents.

Style of play 
Rated as one of the most promising Italian talents of his generation, Casadei has been described as a well-rounded and modern midfielder, who excels both physically and technically. He can play on both sides in a three, four or five-man midfield trio, but also as an attacking midfielder, or even in the holding role. Mainly a right-footed player, he's still quite comfortable with his weaker foot, too.

Despite being quite tall and having a slight valgus deformity, he is elegant and comfortable on the ball, whether he is passing it or carrying it, while also showing good pace and coordination. Thanks to his off-the-ball movement, his intelligence and his abilities in shooting and heading, he can get himself many chances to score. Defensively, he tends to dive into tackles and press the opponents, while also using his body to duel with opponents or defend the ball.

Due to his skills, he has been compared to Massimo Ambrosini and Sergej Milinković-Savić, although he cited Nicolò Barella, Marcelo Brozović, Radja Nainggolan and Javier Zanetti as sources of inspiration.

Personal life
Cesare's brother, Ettore, is also a footballer: as of 2022, he plays for the soccer team of the Florida Institute of Technology.

Honours 
Inter Milan U17
 Campionato Nazionale Under-17 Serie A e B: 2019
Inter Milan U19
 Campionato Primavera 1: 2021–22

References

External links
 

2003 births
Living people
Sportspeople from Ravenna
Italian footballers
Italy youth international footballers
Association football midfielders
A.C. Cesena players
Inter Milan players
Chelsea F.C. players
Reading F.C. players